Zarechye is a rural locality (a settlement) in Kostino-Otdelskoye Rural Settlement, Ternovsky District, Voronezh Oblast, Russia. The population was 167 as of 2010.

Geography 
Zarechye is located 26 southwest km of Ternovka (the district's administrative centre) by road. Kostino-Otdelets is the nearest rural locality.

References 

Rural localities in Ternovsky District